Justin B. Hollander is an urban planning and design scholar. He is a professor in the Department of Urban and Environmental Policy and Planning at Tufts University. He holds a Bachelor of Arts (1996) degree from Tufts, a Masters in Regional Planning (2000) from the Department of Landscape Architecture and Regional Planning at the University of Massachusetts, Amherst and a Ph.D. (2007) degree from the E.J. Bloustein School of Policy and Planning at Rutgers.

Career
Hollander studies how cities and regions manage physical change during periods of growth and decline and the cognitive, health, and social dimensions of community well-being. He has made a significant impact on the urban planning field, as evidenced by his election to serve on the Governing Board of the Association of Collegiate Schools of Planning (the US national organization of urban planning academics) and his appointment to the editorial boards of five high-impact internationally renowned urban planning and architecture journals, Planning Practice & Research, the Journal of Planning Education and Research, Architectural Science Review, Archnet-IJAR: International Journal of Architectural Research, and Local Development & Society. His book Cognitive Architecture won the Environmental Design Research Association national research award. He seeks to redefine the conventional models for measuring success in urban planning (e.g. population, employment, or income growth), drawing on research in computer science, psychology, and landscape architecture.

He has made notable contributions to both empirical and theoretical advancements in understanding community change and what planning and policy responses can accomplish.

Bibliography 
Hollander has written nine books, with many serving as textbooks in university classrooms:

 Urban experience and design: Contemporary perspectives on improving the public realm (2021) (co-editor: Ann Sussman)  
 Supporting shrinkage: Better planning and decision-making for legacy cities (2021) (co-authors: Michael P. Johnson, Eliza W. Kinsey, and George R. Chichirau)  
 A research agenda for shrinking cities (2018)
 An ordinary city: Planning for growth and decline in New Bedford, Massachusetts (2018)
 Urban social listening: Potential and pitfalls of using social media data in studying cities (2016) (coauthors: Erin Graves, Henry Renski, Cara Foster-Karim, Andrew Wiley, and Dibyendu Das)
 Cognitive architecture: Designing for how we respond to the built environment (2015, 2nd edition 2021) (coauthor: Ann Sussman)
 Sunburnt cities: The Great Recession, depopulation and urban planning in the American Sunbelt (2011)
 Principles of brownfields regeneration: Clean-up, design, and re-use of derelict land (2010) (coauthors: Niall Kirkwood and Julia Gold) (translated into Chinese by the Chinese Architectural and Building Press [2014] and Korean by Daega [2013]).
 Polluted, and dangerous: America’s worst abandoned properties and what can be done about them (2009)

References

External links
 Faculty profile

Year of birth missing (living people)
Tufts University alumni
Living people
American urban planners
Rutgers University alumni
University of Massachusetts Amherst alumni
Tufts University faculty